Zonal Councils are advisory councils and are made up of the states of India that have been grouped into five zones to foster cooperation among them. These were set up vide Part-III of the States Reorganisation Act, 1956. 

The Union Home Minister is the common chairman of five zonal councils. Each chief minister acts as a vice chairman of the council by rotation, holding office for a period of one year at a time.  

The present composition of each of these Zonal Councils is as under:

The Northeastern states are not covered by any of the Zonal Councils and their special problems are addressed by another statutory body, the North Eastern Council at Shillong, created by the North Eastern Council Act, 1971. This council originally comprised Arunachal Pradesh, Assam, Manipur, Meghalaya, Mizoram, Nagaland and Tripura; later the state of Sikkim was also added vide North Eastern Council (Amendment) Act, 2002 notified on 23 December 2002.
 
The union territories of Andaman and Nicobar Islands and Lakshadweep are not members of any of the Zonal Councils. However, they are presently special invitees to the Southern Zonal Council.

See also
 Cultural Zones of India
 List of special economic zones in India
 List of ecoregions in India
 Administrative divisions of India

References

Councils of India